TVB Korea Channel (TVBK) is a joint television channel of Central Multi-broadband (CMB) of South Korea and Hong Kong's Television Broadcasts (International) Limited (TVBI).  The channel is broadcast in Korean.

History
TVB Korea Channel is a joint television channel with CMB and TVBI.  The channel is mainly broadcast the television dramas which are produced by TVB that mostly are from Hong Kong.  The channel is under testing since March 2008 and officially broadcasting since June 2008.  For the coverage, around 9 million users of the cable TV users in South Korea for the channel.

Program
The audience are mainly Koreans as this channel broadcasts mostly Hong Kong TVB produced television dramas.  Moreover, for the culture and entertainment variety shows, TVB Korea channels provide with program with Korea, Japan, Taiwan and mainland China.

See also
 Chunghwa TV

References

External links
 Official website of TVBK(site seems to have been moved or hacked?)

K
Television networks in South Korea
Television channels in South Korea
Television channels and stations established in 2008
Korean-language television stations